Böhm's bee-eater (Merops boehmi) is a species of bird in the family Meropidae. It is found in Democratic Republic of the Congo, Malawi, Mozambique, Tanzania, and Zambia.

The name of this bird commemorates the German zoologist Richard Böhm.

References

Böhm's bee-eater
Birds of Southern Africa
Birds of East Africa
Böhm's bee-eater
Taxonomy articles created by Polbot